Sylvia Lyons Render (June 8, 1913 – February 3, 1986) was an American academic and curator. Recognized for her expertise in the life and writings of Charles W. Chestnutt, Render was the first African American to earn a doctoral degree from the Vanderbilt Peabody College of Education and the first person to hold the position of manuscript curator in African American history at the Library of Congress.

Early life and education 
Render was born on June 8, 1913, in Atlanta, Georgia, the only child of Lewis Rudolph Lyons and Mamie Beatrice Foster Lyons. She grew up in Tuscaloosa, Alabama, and Nashville, Tennessee, graduating from Nashville's Pearl High School. She received her Bachelor of Science degree in 1934 from Tennessee State University, where she was class valedictorian. She received an MA from Ohio State University in 1952, attended the University of Chicago, and became the first African American to receive a PhD from the George Peabody College for Teachers in 1962.

Career 
In 1950, Render began working as director of out-of-state financial aid at Florida A&M University. Between 1952 and 1964, she rose through the academic ranks from instructor to full professor. From 1964 to 1974, she was a professor of English at North Carolina Central University. She was also a visiting professor at George Peabody College for Teachers in the summer of 1970. During her academic career, she received postdoctoral grants and awards from the Ford Foundation, the American Philosophical Society, and the National Endowment for the Humanities.

In 1974, Render became manuscript curator and specialist in African American history at the Manuscript Division of the Library of Congress, becoming the first person to hold the newly created position. One of her chief responsibilities was to solicit donations of manuscripts, helping to acquire the records of the NAACP and the National Urban League. She retired on December 24, 1983. In 1981, the NAACP named her Outstanding Woman of the Year, and Governor Bob Graham recognized her as one of Florida's outstanding African American citizens in 1986.

Render was an expert in the life and writings of Charles W. Chesnutt and published numerous articles on Chestnutt. She authored the Encyclopædia Britannica article on Chestnutt as well as editing The Short Fiction of Charles W. Chestnutt (published by Howard University Press in 1974) and a biography entitled Charles W. Chesnutt (Twayne Publishers, 1980). The Charles Waddell Chesnutt Association offers the Sylvia Lyons Render Award “in recognition of outstanding scholarship on the life and works of Charles Waddell Chesnutt.”

Personal life 
Render moved to St. Petersburg, Florida, in 1984. She died on February 3, 1986, at Tampa General Hospital.

Render married Frank Wyatt Render in 1935 and had one son.

Selected works
 The characteristics of women in the non-dramatic prose works of Robert Green, M.A., 1952 
 Eagle with clipped wings : form and feeling in the fiction of Charles Waddell Chesnutt, 1962
 Afro-American women, the outstanding and the obscure, 1975
 Charles W. Chesnutt, 1980
 Folklore in the fiction of Charles W. Chestnutt : factual, funny, fantastic, forthright and functional, 1981

References 

1913 births
1986 deaths
20th-century American women
20th-century American women educators
African-American women academics
American women academics
Florida A&M University faculty
North Carolina Central University faculty
Tennessee State University alumni
Ohio State University alumni
Peabody College alumni
People from Atlanta
Librarians at the Library of Congress
Writers from Atlanta
American academics of English literature
American women librarians
American librarians
American curators
American women curators
20th-century African-American academics
20th-century American academics